The following Union Army units and commanders fought in the Battle of Nashville of the American Civil War. Order of battle compiled from the army organization during the battle (December 15–16, 1864). The Union force was a conglomerate of units from several different departments provisionally attached to George H. Thomas’ Department of the Cumberland.  The IV Corps and the District of Etowah were permanently attached to the Department of the Cumberland while the Cavalry Corps had been attached to the Army of the Cumberland until October 1864 when it was transferred to the Military Division of the Mississippi.  The XXIII Corps was detached from the Department of the Ohio and Smith’s Corps (formerly known as the Right Wing-XVI Corps) was detached from the Department of the Tennessee.  Other brigades and regiments from the Army of the Tennessee which were unable to rejoin their respective commands were organized into the Provisional Division and attached to the District of the Etowah.

The Confederate order of battle is shown separately.

Abbreviations used

Military rank
 MG = Major General
 BG = Brigadier General
 Col = Colonel
 Ltc = Lieutenant Colonel
 Maj = Major
 Cpt = Captain
 Lt = Lieutenant

Other
 w = wounded
 mw= mortally wounded
 k = killed

Army of the Cumberland

MG George H. Thomas, Commanding

Headquarters
Chief of Staff: BG William D. Whipple

IV Corps

BG Thomas J. Wood

XXIII Corps

MG John M. Schofield

Detachment, Army of the Tennessee 
MG Andrew J. Smith

Provisional Detachment (District of the Etowah)
MG James B. Steedman

Cavalry Corps

MG James H. Wilson

Escort:
 4th United States: Lt. Joseph Hedges

Mississippi River Squadron

10th District
Lt. Commander LeRoy Fitch

Notes

References
U.S. War Department, The War of the Rebellion: a Compilation of the Official Records of the Union and Confederate Armies, U.S. Government Printing Office, 1880–1901.
Eicher, John H. and David J., Civil War High Commands. Stanford, CA: Stanford University Press, 2001. 
 McDonough, James Lee. Nashville: The Western Confederacy’s Final Gamble (Knoxville, TN: The University of Tennessee Press), 2004. 
 Sword, Wiley. The Confederacy's Last Hurrah: Spring Hill, Franklin & Nashville (Lawrence, KS: University Press of Kansas), 1992. 
 Franklin-Nashville Campaign website
 Battle of Nashville Preservation Society website - Nashville Naval Battle
 Nashville page, Civil War Home site

American Civil War orders of battle
Union order of battle
George Henry Thomas